Almir Sulejmanović (born 26 January 1978) is a Slovenian football manager and former player who was most recently the head coach of Rudar Velenje.

References

External links
Player profile at NZS 

1978 births
Living people
People from Velenje
Slovenian people of Bosniak descent
Slovenian footballers
Slovenia youth international footballers
Slovenia under-21 international footballers
Association football fullbacks
NK Rudar Velenje players
NK Celje players
Slovenian expatriate footballers
Expatriate footballers in Belgium
Slovenian expatriate sportspeople in Belgium
Expatriate footballers in Lithuania
Slovenian expatriate sportspeople in Lithuania
K.R.C. Genk players
FK Atlantas players
NK Mura players
NK Krka players
Expatriate footballers in Ukraine
Slovenian expatriate sportspeople in Ukraine
Ukrainian Premier League players
FC Zorya Luhansk players
FK Vėtra players
Slovenian PrvaLiga players
Expatriate footballers in Albania
Slovenian expatriate sportspeople in Albania
KF Elbasani players
KF Skënderbeu Korçë players
NK Aluminij players
Expatriate footballers in Austria
Slovenian expatriate sportspeople in Austria
Slovenian football managers
NK Rudar Velenje managers